Norrköping Central Station is a railway station located at Norrköping in  Norrköping Municipality, Sweden. It is located on the Southern Main Line, which runs from Katrineholm to Malmö.

Railway stations in Östergötland County
Railway stations on the Southern Main Line
Buildings and structures in Norrköping
Railway stations opened in 1866
1866 establishments in Sweden
Transit centers in Sweden